Oliver L. Brown (August 19, 1918 – June 20, 1961) was an African-American welder who was the plaintiff in the landmark 1954 U.S. Supreme Court case Oliver Brown, et al. v. Board of Education of Topeka, et al. He was recruited to be part of the Topeka NAACP legal action to desegregate the city's public elementary schools in 1950. At the time, Brown was a welder for the Atchison, Topeka and Santa Fe Railway and was studying to become a minister. Attorney Charles Scott, who was his childhood friend, asked him to join the roster of parents who would become plaintiffs in the organization’s case against the Topeka Board of Education.

By the fall of 1950, the Topeka NAACP had assembled a group of 13 parents to serve as plaintiffs for the case that would eventually be filed under the name of one of the parents, Oliver Brown, becoming known as Oliver L. Brown et al. v. the Board of Education of Topeka (KS). In the Topeka NAACP case, parents involved were concerned that their children had to be bused many blocks away from their neighborhoods when there were schools nearby. However, those schools were segregated for white children only. African-American children were assigned to one of the only four segregated schools for them.

After an unsuccessful attempt in federal district court, the NAACP case was appealed to the United States Supreme Court where it was joined with cases from Delaware, South Carolina, Virginia and Washington, D.C..

After the initial arguments in early 1953, the high court suffered the loss of Chief Justice Fred Vinson who died suddenly. President Dwight Eisenhower then appointed former California Governor Earl Warren who set a schedule for the cases to be reargued in late 1953. After several months of oral arguments, led by attorney Thurgood Marshall who was Director/Counsel for the NAACP Legal Defense Fund, on May 17, 1954, Chief Justice Warren announced the court’s landmark unanimous decision in favor of the plaintiffs.

The plaintiffs included several hundred parents in addition to the thirteen families in the Topeka case. As fate would have it, Oliver Brown was not alphabetically first on the Topeka case roster, yet this landmark decision is named for him. His fellow plaintiff Darlene Brown was alphabetically first, but it appears that Oliver Brown’s gender may have been the reason for his place as lead plaintiff since he was also not the first to join the roster, was not alphabetically first among the Topeka plaintiffs but was the only male.

This decision overturned the separate but equal doctrine that had been used as the standard in Civil Rights lawsuits since the Plessy v. Ferguson case in 1896, in effect declaring it unconstitutional to have separate public schools for Black and White students. The decision is considered a major milestone in the Civil Rights Movement.

Brown was only 42 in 1961, when he died suddenly of a heart attack when he became ill on the Kansas Turnpike just outside of Lawrence, while riding with fellow pastor Maurice Lange en route to Topeka where his wife and daughters were visiting her parents.

In 1988, the nonprofit Brown Foundation for Educational Equity, Excellence and Research was founded by Oliver Brown’s family along with Topeka community members to preserve the legacy of the Brown decision. His daughter Cheryl Brown Henderson is Founding President of the foundation. On October 26, 1992, after two years of work by the Brown Foundation, President George H. W. Bush signed the Brown v. The Board of Education National Historic Site Act, establishing the former Monroe Elementary School, one of the four formerly segregated African American elementary schools, as a national historic site.

Oliver and Leola’s eldest daughter Linda Brown Thompson died on March 25, 2018 at the age of 75. When she died, the media reported erroneously that she had been the center of the Brown case, when in fact the focus of the arguments was on behalf of numerous plaintiffs from the five cases consolidated by the United States Supreme Court.

References

External links
The Brown Foundation website, brownvboard.org
Brown v. Board at 50 - providing opportunity
 56-minute video.
 Transcript of television broadcast segment.

1918 births
1961 deaths
American people in rail transportation
Atchison, Topeka and Santa Fe Railway people
Activists for African-American civil rights
People from Topeka, Kansas
People from Springfield, Missouri
Activists from Kansas
Activists from Missouri
Welders
African-American activists
American Methodists